Wacharapong Tongsri (born February 12, 1985, in Nakhon Nayok, Thailand) is a Thai professional basketball player.  He currently plays for the PEA Sports Club of the Thailand Basketball League. Tongsri is arguably Thailand's most prominent basketball figure.

He played most minutes and grabbed most rebounds for the Thailand national basketball team at the 2013 FIBA Asia Championship in the Philippines.

Career overview
Wacharapong Tongsri played professional basketball for the following teams:
 2012-14 Thailand Slammers 
 2015–present PEA

References

1985 births
Living people
Wacharapong Tongsri
Wacharapong Tongsri
Shooting guards